Leptosphaerulina trifolii is a plant pathogen.

See also
 List of soybean diseases

References

Fungal plant pathogens and diseases
Pleosporaceae
Soybean diseases
Fungi described in 1959